Players and pairs who neither have high enough rankings nor receive wild cards may participate in a qualifying tournament held one week before the annual Wimbledon Tennis Championships.

The qualifying tournament was held from 18 to 20 June 1996 in the England Sports Grounds in Roehampton, United Kingdom.

Seeds

  Annabel Ellwood /  Louise Pleming (second round)
  Isabelle Demongeot /  Caroline Dhenin (qualified)
  Julia Lutrova /  Tamarine Tanasugarn (qualifying competition, lucky losers)
  Danielle Jones /  Tessa Price (qualifying competition, lucky losers)

Qualifiers

  Julie Pullin /  Lorna Woodroffe
  Isabelle Demongeot /  Caroline Dhenin

Lucky losers

  Julia Lutrova /  Tamarine Tanasugarn
  Danielle Jones /  Tessa Price

Qualifying draw

First qualifier

Second qualifier

References

External links

1996 Wimbledon Championships on WTAtennis.com
1996 Wimbledon Championships – Women's draws and results at the International Tennis Federation

Women's Doubles Qualifying
Wimbledon Championship by year – Women's doubles qualifying
Wimbledon Championships